Ken (born November 28, 1968 in Maibara, Shiga, Japan) is a musician and singer-songwriter, best known as guitarist of the Japanese rock band L'Arc-en-Ciel. He is also the leader, vocalist and guitarist of Sons of All Pussys (also known as S.O.A.P.) and has released a solo album entitled In Physical. While in L'Arc-en-Ciel his name is stylized as ken.

Biography

L'Arc-en-Ciel 
Two months before his graduation in 1992, Ken left the Nagoya Institute of Technology, where he was an architect major, to join L'Arc-en-Ciel at the request of his childhood friend Tetsuya. He has written a breadth of L'Arc-en-Ciel's music ever since his joining, including "As if in a Dream", "Vivid Colors", "Niji", "The Fourth Avenue Cafe", "Shout at the Devil", "Kasou", "Lies and Truth", "Lover Boy", "My Heart Draws a Dream", "Lost Heaven", "Daybreak's Bell" and "Twinkle Twinkle".

Sons of All Pussys 
In 2002 Ken formed his own band, Sons of All Pussys (S.O.A.P.), as a result of a break in L'Arc-en-Ciel's activities, with ex-L'Arc-en-Ciel member Yasunori "Sakura" Sakurazawa as drummer, and Ein as bassist (a half Japanese/German model who appeared in a few L'Arc PVs). Each member contributed songs based on themes; Ken with love, Ein with desire, and Sakura with his experiences in jail, and together they released three albums; Grace, Gimme A Guitar, High! and one single, "Paradise". All S.O.A.P. activities have ceased since 2004.

Solo career 
On August 23, 2006, Ken released a solo single titled "Speed", and has taken a new "clean" appearance similar to his early days with L'Arc-en-Ciel. In 2008, he began releasing more singles, including "Deeper" and "S", leading up to the eventual release of his first solo album, In Physical, in 2009.

Guitars 
Ken is currently an endorser for Fernandes Guitars and is usually seen playing these guitars live with L'Arc-en-Ciel. However he tends to modify his models instead of using them stock. For instance, in the past he used to use Van Zandt pick-ups heavily in his own personal guitars and has since moved on to Kinman pick-ups (this change having now been reflected in one of his more recent Fernandes signature models).

However he has also used many different guitars in and out of L'Arc-en-Ciel, including Gibson, Fender, and Steinberger models.

In 2010, he endorsed the American-based guitar brand Fender, Ken (together with Inoran from Luna Sea) was approached by Fender and signed the endorsement contract; his signature model is a Stratocaster.

Discography

Albums 
 In Physical (2009.04.22)

Mini albums 
 The Party (2010.08.04)

Singles 
 "Speed" (2006.08.23)
 "Deeper" (2009.03.04)

Videos 
 Ken Tour 2009 "Live in Physical" (2009.11.18)

Production work
Mucc
 "Ageha" (2008.08.27)
 "Sora to Ito" (2009.01.28)
 "Freesia" (2009.11.25)
Also arrangement.

Baroque (band)
 "Girl" (2016.10.26)

References

External links 
 

1968 births
Living people
L'Arc-en-Ciel members
Sony Music Entertainment Japan artists
Japanese rock guitarists
Japanese male singer-songwriters
Japanese male rock singers
Visual kei musicians
Japanese alternative rock musicians
Musicians from Shiga Prefecture
20th-century Japanese guitarists
21st-century Japanese guitarists